The King is Dead is a British comedy show created, written by and starring Simon Bird. Also presenting are Nick Mohammed and Katy Wix. It aired on Thursdays at 10.30pm on BBC Three, with repeats on both Friday and Saturday.

Overview
Each week on The King Is Dead a well-known public figure is hypothetically bumped off. It's down to the comedic interview panel, led by Simon Bird, to scour the Great British celebrity pool for a top-notch replacement. Three celebrities compete in an interview process in a bid to prove they are the best applicant for the available job.

The show was cancelled in October 2010 after it was panned by critics and obtained low ratings.

Format
Each episode Nick Mohammad, Katy Wix and Simon Bird tell the contestants a person such as the Archbishop is dead, and chaos will ensue, as evidenced by Nick's going to the door and viewing a riot outside. Three celebrities are introduced as candidates to succeed him or her. When they do a postman (Mathew Baynton) comes in asking for a signature for e.g. Archbishop when they tell him that e.g. The Archbishop is dead

Round 1: The Basics 

In this round them three place three famous celebs as the names like Bobbies. Bobby Charlton, Bobby Davro, and Bob the Builder the celeb will pick it and see what is behind it. it has also some facts about the challenge, also the part where they get Darren when the audience boo at him, each of the challenges is rewarded with three points.

Round 2: The Grilling 

Simon presses the button and the light chooses the contestant for a humorous interview with Nick Mohammad. Interviews may consist of solely yes-no questions, quickfires, or choices. For instance, in the Chief of Police episode, Caprice was asked to choose between Gandhi and Nelson Mandela.

Round 3: Speed Round 

This is the final chance to earn points. Simon answer the celebs questions that are based on facts, and they receive two points for a correct answer. When time is up, Katy Wix announces the scores. The top two candidates with proceed, while the loser is escorted to the door by Nick Mohammed.

Final Round: Head to Head

In the last round, the two finalists go head to head in a challenge. Past challenges have included:
 The President of the USA: Contestants had to kiss babies
 Chief of Police: Contestants had to get into a container of biscuits and meat; a dog decided who was to be Chief of Police
 The King: Contestants inserted printer cartridges, inflated armbands, and smashed the champagne
 The Assistant Regional Head of Sales: Contestants used a supply cabinet to play darts with eggs. (but it was a Test cause the Real assistant head would never stand for bullying.)
 King of the Jungle: Using disability assistance type animals, contestants had to place objects in the suitcase
 Father Christmas: Contestants performed a list of actions, moving at the speed of light, but in slow motion: eat the pies, give granddad a kiss, place the present in the stockings. Their time could be reduced by guessing what Nick and Katy are acting out in a game of Charades

Episode list
In total six regular episodes and one clips show have been broadcast, seven in total (bold indicates winner).

References

External links

2010 British television series debuts
2010 British television series endings
2010s British comedy television series
BBC television comedy
BBC television game shows
British panel games
Television series by Fremantle (company)
2010s British game shows
English-language television shows
Television game shows with incorrect disambiguation